Noble (full title Noble -Vampires' Chronicle-) is the debut album from Versailles. It was first released digitally on July 9, 2008 exclusively on international iTunes Stores, and then in a standard CD release on July 16.

This album was released in four different editions. The first edition is the standard Japanese edition which came with 12 tracks and an additional DVD containing three music videos. The European edition released on the same day featured the single version of "The Revenant Choir" as a bonus track. The American edition was released on October 21, 2009 and featured the song "Prince" as its bonus track. The Japanese re-issue also contained "Prince" as a bonus track, but it did not include the DVD. It reached number 42 on the Oricon Charts and stayed on the charts for 4 weeks.

Track listing

References 

Versailles (band) albums
2008 debut albums